Yechiel Michel Feinstein (27 June 1906 – 17 May 2003) was a Haredi rabbi and rosh yeshiva in Israel and the United States.

Biography
Feinstein, the son of Avrohom Yitzchok Feinstein, was born in Uzda, Lithuania, then part of the Russian empire. His father died when he was seven and he went to live with his grandfather, Dovid Feinstein, the rabbi of Starobin, Belarus. His uncle was Moshe Feinstein.

He went to Slutsk after his bar mitzvah to study under Isser Zalman Meltzer. When the Bolsheviks seized power Meltzer's yeshiva fled to Kletsk, Poland. During his three years in Kletsk, Feinstein attended the Talmudic lectures of Meltzer and his son-in-law, Aharon Kotler. Then he transferred to the Mir Yeshiva where he studied with Yeruchom Lebovitz

Feinstein studied in Brisk under Yitzchok Zev Soloveitchik. While there he became subject to conscription into the army, so he traveled to Grodno to obtain fake medical forms from a doctor and en route, consulted with Yisrael Meir Kagan (the Chofetz Chaim) in Radin about evading the draft. Feinstein stayed in Grodno for half a year, where he studied under Shimon Shkop. He then returned to Brisk to continue studying under Soloveitchik, spending the summer months at the Mir Yeshiva. When World War II broke out, he traveled to Vilna with other students from the Mir.

From Vilna Feinstein joined the Mir Yeshiva in exile in Japan. He arrived in the United States in 1941 with Aharon Kotler. Feinstein was mashgiach for Joseph B. Soloveitchik in Boston. Less than a year later he joined his uncle, Moshe Feinstein,  as the head of Mesivtha Tifereth Jerusalem in the Lower East Side, Manhattan. He was appointed a member of the Agudas HaRabbonim and assisted the Vaad Hatzolah in rescuing Jews and aiding the war refugees in Europe.

Israel
In 1946, Feinstein visited Palestine and in August married Lifsha, the daughter of his former teacher Soloveitchik, in Jerusalem. He returned to America and continued as rosh yeshiva until 1952, when he and his family immigrated to Israel and he established Yeshivas Beis Yehuda in Tel Aviv.

In 1973 after the death of one of his daughters Feinstein moved to Bnei Brak.

He died on the night of 17 May 2003 (16 Iyar 5763).

Family tree

References

20th-century American rabbis
20th-century Israeli rabbis
Rosh yeshivas
Haredi rabbis in Israel
1906 births
2003 deaths